NGC 6316 is a globular cluster located in the constellation Ophiuchus. Its Shapley-Sawyer Concentration Class is III, meaning that it has a "strong inner core of stars" and was discovered by the German-born British astronomer William Herschel on 24 May 1784. It is at a distance of about 37,000 light years away from the Earth. NGC 6316 has a metallicity of -0.45; this means that its ratio of hydrogen/helium to other elements is only 35% that of the Sun, but still enough to be considered a "metal-rich" globular cluster.

See also 
 List of NGC objects (6001–7000)
 List of NGC objects

References

External links 
 

Globular clusters
6316
Ophiuchus (constellation)